Ingeborg Auer is an Austrian climatologist, known for her work on Project HISTALP (Historical Instrumental Climatological Surface Time Series of the Greater Alpine Region).

Auer comes from Velden am Wörthersee. She studied from 1970 to 1975 at the Institute for Meteorology and Geophysics of the University of Vienna, where she received her doctorate with thesis Zur Chronik und Synoptik in den österreichischen Südalpenländernon (To the Chronicle and Synoptics in the Austrian Southern Alps). From 1975 Auer worked at the Central Institution for Meteorology and Geodynamics. In 2001 she became the head of the department for climatological land survey and hydroclimatology. In 2009 she became the head of the Climate Research Department. She retired in 2016.

Auer is known for her contribution to the creation of high-quality data sets for climate research, especially in the field of homogenization. Under her leadership together with Reinhard Böhm, the HISTALP climate database for the Alpine region was created. The HISTALP database is one of the most long-term and high-quality climate data sets in the world. The data based on her work shows that since 1800 the climatic zones in the Alps have moved to significantly higher elevations as part of climate change: In mountainous areas where there used to be snow all year round there is now often grass; where there was grass, forest often grows today.

Selected publications

References

Living people
University of Vienna alumni
Austrian climatologists
Austrian women scientists
Year of birth missing (living people)